The 2004–05 season was the 85th season in the existence of Hamburger SV and the club's 42nd consecutive season in the top flight of German football. In addition to the domestic league, Hamburger SV participated in this season's edition of the DFB-Pokal and the Intertoto Cup. The season covered the period from 1 July 2004 to 30 June 2005.

Transfers

In

Out

Players

First-team squad
Squad at end of season

Left club during season

Hamburger SV Amateure

Competitions

Overall record

Bundesliga

League table

Results summary

Results by round

Matches

DFB-Pokal

Intertoto Cup

Third round

Semi-finals

Statistics

Goalscorers

Notes

References

Hamburger SV seasons
Hamburger SV